Jungle Manhunt is a 1951 adventure film written by Samuel Newman and directed by Lew Landers. It was the seventh entry in the "Jungle Jim" series of films starring Johnny Weissmuller as the title character. Based on the comic strip "Jungle Jim" created by Alex Raymond,

Plot 
In the African jungles, local tribes are terrorized by costumed skeleton people who kidnap the men of a local village. However, Bono. the local chieftain is able to escape. Jungle Jim rescues a photographer,  Anne Lawrence,  when her boat overturns  She explains that she is searching for football player Bob Miller (played by real-life footballer Bob Waterfield) and enlists Jim to help with her search.

Bono, looking for his tribesmen, agrees to join the search as both trails seem to lead to the same place.

They subsequently stumble upon a crazed doctor who has been kidnapping villagers to work in a radioactive mine, where he has discovered a way of making diamonds out of mineral rocks, The group manages to stop the doctor's plan by exploding the mine. Bob and Anne agree to stay in the village to continue with improvements.

Cast
Johnny Weissmuller ... Jungle Jim
Bob Waterfield ... Bob Miller
Sheila Ryan ... Anna Lawrence
Rick Vallin ... Matusa Chief Bono
Lyle Talbot ... Dr. Mitchell Heller
Tamba the Chimp

Production
The Dinosaurs featured in the movie as are stock footage from One Million BC). Music by Mischa Bakaleinikoff

Home media

Released on DVD on March 4, 2011.

Review

Leonard Martin gave the movie 1.5 out of 5 stars. Variety found the movie to be typical of the genre, stating it was hokey and not aimed at adults.

References

External links 
 
Review of film at Variety

1951 films
1950s science fiction films
Films directed by Lew Landers
Columbia Pictures films
Jungle Jim films
Films set in Africa
American science fiction films
American black-and-white films
1950s English-language films
1950s American films